This is a list of airlines which have a current air operator's certificate issued by the Civil Aviation Authority of Mongolia.

Scheduled airlines

Charter airlines

Cargo airlines

See also
List of defunct airlines of Mongolia
List of airlines of Asia
List of defunct airlines of Asia
List of airports in Mongolia
Buyant-Ukhaa International Airport

References

 

 
Mongolia
Airlines
Airlines
Mongolia